Miesque's Approval (foaled March 3, 1999 in Florida) is an American Thoroughbred racehorse who won the 2006 Breeders' Cup Mile and was voted that year's American Champion Male Turf Horse. He was bred and raced by Charlotte Weber's Live Oak Plantation and trained by Marty Wolfson.

Retired early into the 2007 racing season, Miesque's Approval was sold to Kwazulu Natal Breeders Club and the Scott Brothers's Highdown Stud in Kwazulu-Natal, South Africa. Under the sales agreement, Live Oak Stud retained Northern Hemisphere breeding rights to the horse.

Pedigree

References

1999 racehorse births
American Champion racehorses
Racehorses bred in Florida
Racehorses trained in the United States
Breeders' Cup Mile winners
Eclipse Award winners
Thoroughbred family 7